Viru-Kabala is a village in Vinni Parish, Lääne-Viru County, in northeastern Estonia. It is located by the Tallinn–Narva (Tallinn–Saint Petersburg) railway, 18 km east of Rakvere and 9 km west of Sonda. The village has a population of 113 (as of 1 January 2019). Prior to the 2017 administrative reform of Estonian local governments, the village was located in Rägavere Parish.

References

Villages in Lääne-Viru County